The following is a list of events affecting American television during 1991.

Events

Programs

Debuts

Returning this year

Entering syndication this year
A list of programs (current or canceled) that have accumulated enough episodes (between 65 and 100) or seasons (3 or more) to be eligible for off-network syndication and/or basic cable runs.

Changes of network affiliation
The following shows aired new episodes on a different network than previous first-run episodes:

Ending this year

Made-for-TV movies and miniseries

Television stations

Station launches

Network affiliation changes

Station closures

Births

Deaths

See also
 1991 in the United States
 List of American films of 1991

References

External links 
List of 1991 American television series at IMDb

 
1990s in American television